DC Universe Presents Batman Superman was part of the 'Collector's Edition' line of DC Comics anthologies published monthly in the UK by Titan Magazines from September 2007 to March 2008. It reprinted DC Comics titles from the United States featuring Batman, Superman and related characters from the DC Universe and accompanied Batman Legends, Justice League Legends and Superman Legends as the fourth DC Collectors' Edition published by Titan.

DC Universe Presents Batman Superman was ultimately cancelled with issue #7 due to lack of sales.

Format
Following a similar format to the Marvel Collector's Editions published in the UK by Panini Comics, each issue was 76 pages long, typically reprinted three modern stories and was sold once every 28 days through UK newsagents. Each issue also included the 'Roll Call' feature found in each of Titan's monthly DC titles, which spotlighted various DC graphic novels and included a 'Hero of the Month' panel.

Printed material
Stories that were printed in DC Universe Presents Batman Superman were:
 Issues 1-6: "The Enemies Among Us" from Superman/Batman
 Issues 1-7: Supergirl
 Issues 1-6: The Brave and the Bold
 Issue 7: Legends of the Dark Knight #214
 Issue 7: All-Flash

See also

 Batman Legends
 DC Universe Presents
 Batman The Brave and the Bold

External links
Titan Magazines Home Page

References

Titan Magazines titles
Publications established in 2007
Batman titles
Superman titles